St. Maughans is a village in Monmouthshire, south east Wales, United Kingdom.

Location

St. Maughans is located three miles north west of Monmouth.

History and amenities

St. Maughans is close to the River Monnow and the border with England. The parish contains the Hilston Park.

The village has a church, the Church of St Maughan dedicated to Saint Maughan, which dates from the 12th or 13th century and has a distinctive local dovecote belfry. The church was much restored by architect J. P. Seddon in 1865/6.

The village has given its name to the St. Maughans Formation, the lowest Devonian rocks of the Old Red Sandstone.

References

External links
 Kelly's Directory of Monmouthshire 1901
 

Villages in Monmouthshire